High-voltage transformer fire barriers, or transformer firewalls, transformer ballistic firewalls, transformer blast walls, are outdoor countermeasures against cascading failures in a national electric grid. The purpose of these barriers, like common fire barriers in building construction, is compartmentalisation of transformer fires, and compartmentalisation of transformer and bushing explosions―in which the fuel source of both fires and explosions is the transformer oil. Without compartmentalisation, one ruptured transformer could start its neighbouring transformer on fire and thus create a domino effect that would affect the surrounding electric grid, particularly during peak times. 

High-voltage transformer fire barriers are typically located in electrical substations, but may also be attached to buildings, such as valve halls or manufacturing plants with large electrical distribution systems, such as pulp and paper mills. Outdoor transformer fire barriers that are attached at least on one side to a building are referred to as wing walls. At times, high-voltage transformers can be located immediately outside and sometimes inside of buildings, requiring higher fire-resistance ratings than other fire compartments in a building.

Voluntary recommendations by NFPA 850
The primary North American document that deals with outdoor high-voltage transformer fire barriers is NFPA 850. NFPA 850 outlines that outdoor oil-insulated transformers should be separated from adjacent structures and from each other by firewalls, spatial separation, or other approved means for the purpose of limiting the damage and potential spread of fire from a transformer failure.

Alternatives or enhancements to transformer fire barriers
The following may be used in place of or in addition to transformer fire barriers, depending on the design goals.

Automatic fire suppression systems
Fire protection water spray systems are used to cool a transformer to prevent damage if exposed to radiation heat transfer from a fire involving oil released from another transformer that has failed.

Transformer Fast Depressurization Systems (FDS)
Passive mechanical systems designed to depressurize the transformer a few milliseconds after the occurrence of an electrical fault. Those systems minimize the chance that a transformer tank will rupture given a minor fault but are not effective on major internal faults.

Alternatives to mineral-based transformer oil
Transformer oil is available in different levels of ignitability, including those approved by FM Global. FM Data Sheet 5-4 indicates different levels of protection depending on the type of fluid used. Alternatives include, but are not limited to, esters and silicone oil.

See also

 Arc fault
 Cascading failure
 Countermeasure
 Critical infrastructure protection
 Electric grid security
 Electrical power distribution
 Fire test
 Firewall (construction)
 North American Electric Reliability Corporation
 Passive fire protection

References

Armour
Electric power conversion
Electric transformers
Energy infrastructure
Explosions
Infrastructure
Passive fire protection
Security engineering